North Carolina Safety and Emission Vehicle Inspection is responsible for ensuring that vehicles in North Carolina meet the safety and in some counties emissions standards. A fee is charged for the inspection of vehicles, and an extra fee if your vehicle has after-market window tinting.

Which vehicles get inspected? 

North Carolina has a total of 100 counties.  In all North Carolina counties, passenger vehicles under 35 years old require a yearly Safety Inspection.   48 of North Carolina’s 100 counties require inspected vehicles to undergo a yearly Safety and Emission inspection for vehicles that are model years 1996 or newer.

Which vehicles are exempt from inspection? 

Passenger Vehicles over 35 years old are exempt from safety and emissions inspection.  In addition, any vehicle in one of the 48 Safety and Emission counties that has a Gross Vehicle Weight Rating (GVWR) greater than 8,500 pounds only requires a Safety inspection.

As of April 1, 2015 North Carolina General Statute 20-183.2 exempts certain vehicles within the most recent three model years, and having fewer than 70,000 miles on the odometer, from emissions inspection.  The NC Department of Environmental Quality provides a calculator to help determine if a particular vehicle may be exempt.

NC Vehicle Inspection Price 

Safety inspection fees are $13.60. Emissions inspection fees, which include Safety
Inspection, cost $30.00.  After market window tinting costs an additional $10 for both inspections.

How to become a NC Vehicle inspector 

To become a Safety Inspector in North Carolina, one must attend an eight-hour Safety Inspection course offered by a North Carolina Community College.  At the conclusion of the class, the student is required to pass a fifty-question multiple choice written exam, scoring no less than eighty percent.  Students who wish to perform both Safety and Emission Inspections must attend an additional eight-hour Emission Inspection class.  Before beginning to work as an inspector, students must be certified by local Inspectors/Auditors.  This process requires the students to successfully complete a live vehicle inspection administered by a Department of Motor Vehicle Representative.

A certified Inspector’s Safety license is valid for 4 years, while the Inspectors Emission license is valid for 2 years.  Students are required to maintain these licenses by returning to a North Carolina Community College to re-certify.

See also 

Government of North Carolina

References

External links 
 North Carolina Community College System
 NCDOT Division of Motor Vehicles
 NC Safety and Emissions Regulations Manual Online Version

State agencies of North Carolina